Gordon High School is situated in Somerset West, South Africa, near the N2 road and next to Danie Ackermann Primary School. It has over 1300 pupils. It  is bordered by the Somerset mall.

Maskot:bird  
          
Colors:green and black 
       
Principal:Mr. B. Simons

It is known to have friendly rivalries with Hotentots Holland High School

Schools in South Africa